Yemelyan is a given name. Notable people with the name include:

Yemelyan Danilov (1627–1654), Russian bellmaker
Yemelyan Pugachev (1742–1775), pretender to the Russian throne, led a Cossack insurrection during the reign of Catherine II
Yemelyan Ukraintsev (1641–1708), Russian diplomat and statesman
Yemelyan Yaroslavsky (1878–1943), Russian revolutionary, Soviet politician, communist party organizer, activist, journalist, historian

See also
Emelan
Yemelyanovo (disambiguation)